WBKR (92.5 FM) is an American radio station broadcasting a country music format. The station is licensed to Owensboro, Kentucky. Its powerful 100,000-watt signal covers much of northwest Kentucky and southwest Indiana, including the Evansville area. The station is owned by Townsquare Media. The station transmits from a tower located near Utica, Kentucky on Kentucky Route 140. The studios are located at 3301 Frederica Street in Owensboro.

History
In November 1945, the FCC issued a construction permit to the Hager Family, who were also the owners of WOMI-AM, as well as the Owensboro Messenger-Inquirer daily newspaper. The permit was filed under licensee Owensboro Broadcasting Company. It originally intended to broadcast at 92.3 megacycles, but in 1947, the construction permit was modified to allowed the station to instead broadcast at 92.5 megacycles. The station began operations in 1948 under Special temporary authority as WOMI-FM, simulcasting the original WOMI-AM on a  tower with 60,000 watts of power. It was founded and operated by the Hager Family, Its first official license was granted on April 15, 1949. For its first 27 years on the air, the station simulcast its AM sister station. In 1975, the station’s callsign was changed to the current WBKR when the station became a separate operation, and began broadcasting an automated country music format. Through the ensuing years, little by little, it gradually moved away from automation with a live morning show, and eventually an afternoon show. By 1989, the station began operating with live deejays 24-hours-a-day.  

Both WOMI and WBKR remained in the hands of the heirs of the Hager Family, the original owners, until 1993 when both were sold to Evansville-based Brill Media. Brill Media operated WOMI and WBKR and also bought the cross-town competition and longtime rival stations, WVJS and WSTO three years later. Brill Media declared bankruptcy in 2002, and the stations were placed in the hands of a chapter 11 bankruptcy trustee who sold them. WOMI and WBKR were acquired by Regent Broadcasting Corporation (now Townsquare Media) based in Covington, Kentucky, a cross-river suburb of Cincinnati. WSTO was purchased by South Central Communications Corporation of Evansville, which also operates WIKY-FM. WVJS was purchased by the Cromwell Group, Inc., of Nashville, Tennessee, which also currently operates Philpot-licensed WBIO.

Programming and format
In addition to its country music format, WBKR is the Owensboro-area home to the Performance Radio Network, as well as the UK Sports Radio Network broadcasts of University of Kentucky Wildcats football and men’s basketball games.

Special broadcasts
WBKR is known for its annual Telephone Pioneers Christmas Wish. This program involves monetary donations to needy families (who might not otherwise have much of a Christmas), and listeners can participate in a program where they pick a family to buy Christmas presents for.

Current personalities
The WBKR morning team of Chad Benefield and Angel Welsh is known as The Morning Drive on 92-5. One of the former hosts, Moon Mullins, died in 2017, and was an inductee of the Country Radio Hall of Fame.

The WBKR Midday Show is hosted by Barb Birgy. The WBKR Afternoon Show is hosted by Music Director Dave Spencer. At other times, listeners can hear on-air personalities Erin Grant, Brent Gardner, and Ethan Payne.

References

External links
 

BKR
Owensboro, Kentucky
Townsquare Media radio stations